Ryan Koh is an American television writer. He is currently a writer and co-executive producer for The Simpsons. He has also worked as a writer and producer on The Office, New Girl, Workaholics, and Cougar Town.

Television career

Early career 
Koh began his writing career as a writer on the animated series Kappa Mikey and as a staff writer on the fourth season of The Office. As well as co-writing the webisode series Kevin's Loan with Anthony Farrell, he also contributed two full length scripts for the series. After two seasons, he departed and became a writer for Cougar Town in 2009 and became a co-producer on the show's second season. For his work on The Office, Koh was nominated for three Writers Guild of America awards. He won an Emmy for his work on The Simpsons.

He went to Harvard University where he wrote for the Harvard Lampoon.

Episodes by Koh

Kappa Mikey 
 "Like Ozu Like Son" (1.24)
 "Go Nard Hunting" (2.6) (with James Harvey)
 "Night of the Werepuff" (2.15) (with Robert Berens and Conrad Klein)
 "The Karaoke Episode" (2.16) & (2.17) (with Sean Lahey)
 "Mikey's Memoirs" (2.18) (with Walt Gardner)
 "Seven From LilyMu" (2.19) (with Walt Gardner)
 "Live LilyMu" (2.23) (with Robert Berens)
 "Mitsuki Butterfly" (2.24)

The Office 
 "Business Ethics" (5.02)
 "Heavy Competition" (5.24)

Cougar Town 
 "A Woman in Love (It's Not Me)" (1.06)
 "Finding Out" (1.24)
 "The Same Old You" (2.10)
 "Lost Children" (2.13) (with Sam Laybourne)
 "Money Becomes King" (3.9)

Workaholics 
 "Ders Comes in Handy" (3.9)

New Girl 
 "Parents" (2.8)
 "Quick Hardening Caulk" (2.19)
 "Longest Night Ever" (3.9)
 "Sister II" (3.17)
 "Dance" (3.22)

The Simpsons 
 "Dad Behavior" (28.08)
 "Singin' in the Lane" (29.07)
 "Krusty the Clown" (30.08)
 "The Winter of Our Monetized Content" (31.01)
 "Marge The Lumberjlll" (31.06)
 "The Dad-Feelings Limited" (32.11)
 "Bart the Cool Kid" (33.15)
 "Treehouse of Horror XXXIII" (34.06)
 "When Nelson Met Lisa" (34.09)

References

External links 

1977 births
American television writers
American male television writers
American television producers
Living people
Place of birth missing (living people)
The Harvard Lampoon alumni